The following is a list of bishops of the Roman Catholic Church in Texas. The Texas Catholic Church comprises 15 Latin Church dioceses and one personal ordinariate led by a bishop.

The 15 Latin dioceses are divided into two ecclesiastical provinces.  Each province has a metropolitan archdiocese led by an archbishop, and at least one suffragan diocese. In most archdioceses and some large dioceses, one or more auxiliary bishops serve in association with the diocesan bishop. As of May 2016, one of these metropolitans is a cardinals of the Catholic Church: Galveston-Houston (Daniel DiNardo).

All active and retired bishops in Texas — diocesan, coadjutor, and auxiliary — are members of the United States Conference of Catholic Bishops (USCCB).

Bishops of Latin Church dioceses

Personal Ordinariate of the Chair of Saint Peter

The Personal Ordinariate of the Chair of Saint Peter is "a structure, similar to a diocese, that was created by the Vatican in 2012 for former Anglican communities and clergy seeking to become Catholic. Once Catholic, the communities retain many aspects of their Anglican heritage, liturgy and traditions". The ordinariate uses a missal called Divine Worship: The Missal, a variation of the Roman Rite which incorporates aspects of the Anglican liturgical tradition.

Based in Houston, Texas, with the Cathedral of Our Lady of Walsingham as it principal church, the ordinariate includes 42 parishes throughout the United States and Canada.

Originally, its territory was the same as that of the United States Conference of Catholic Bishops (USCCB). However, it was announced on December 7, 2012, that the Holy See, after consulting the Canadian Conference of Catholic Bishops (CCCB), had extended its territory to include Canada also. Accordingly, the head of the ordinariate is a full member of both episcopal conferences.

Bishops from Texas serving outside of Texas

The following is a list of those bishops who are from Texas, yet are serving outside of Texas.

Former Texas Bishops serving outside of Texas
The following is a list living bishops who are not from Texas, but at one time served as bishops in Texas.

References

Texas
Catholic bishops